Ancistrus maculatus is a tropical fish belonging to the armored catfish family (Loricariidae). The name Ancistrus is derived from the Greek word meaning "hook", akgistron, which refers to the interopercular odontodes found in members of the genus. This fish has the characteristic armored plates of its family and can reach 11.8 cm (4.6 inches) in standard length when fully grown.

Distribution 
This fish's natural habitat is the Amazon River basin in South America and has been reported from the following regions: Cudajas, Obidos, Rio Tajapoura, Rio Chagres. Because of its morphology and the fact that it is similar to other fish from the genus Ancistrus, it can be deduced that this species is demersal, preferring to occupy the river bed.

Diet 
In a similar manner to related species, Ancistrus maculatus possesses a sucker-like mouth, which allows it to adhere to surfaces, even in environments with fast-flowing water currents. This omnivorous species feeds on algae, detritus and aquatic plants with its rasp-like teeth.

Omega iris 
This fish is known to have a modified iris called an omega iris, an adaptation shared with other loricariids. The top part of the iris descends to form a loop which can expand and contract, a structure which is known as an iris operculum. When light levels are high, such as during the day, the pupil reduces in diameter and the loop expands to cover the center of the pupil, forming a crescent-shaped, light-transmitting portion.

Behaviour 
As is the case with most loricariids, this fish is nocturnal and prefers to hide under rocks or driftwood during the day. It can be territorial and quick to drive off other fish from its area when it has reached maturity.

Sexual dimorphism 
The females and males of this species reach analogous length when mature, although they can be differentiated by the soft tentacles (bushy fleshy growths) on the male's snout (although some females also display short tentacles), a trait which is unique to the genus Ancistrus but not unique to this species.

Breeding 
While the breeding behaviour of this fish is unreported, typical actions of related fish when breeding include the pair choosing and cleaning a cave, with the female depositing eggs, which are guarded by the male. The eggs typically hatch in a few days.

In aquaria 
Ancistrus maculatus is not commonly seen in the aquarium trade. However, the maintenance of this species is in all likelihood similar to that of other members of its genus. Ancistrus catfish are a good complement to most aquariums, they are generally not aggressive to other species, although males may fight over territory if kept in a small tank. Ancistrus should be fed mainly on vegetarian foods. Prepared foods include algae wafers and spirulina-based sinking food. Vegetables such as zucchini and cucumber are an excellent addition to the diet, along with a small amount of meaty foods.

References 

maculatus
Fish described in 1881
Catfish of South America
Taxa named by Franz Steindachner